Sitara or Sithara may refer to:

People
 Sithara (actress) (born 1973), Indian actress
 Sithara (singer) (born 1986), Indian singer
 Sitara Devi (1920–2014), Indian dancer
 Sitara (actress), Pakistani film actress
 Sitara Hewitt, a British-Pakistani-American actress
 Mohan Sithara (born 1959), Malayalam film music composer

Film and television
 Sitara (1980 film), a 1980 Hindi-language Indian feature film
 Sitaara, a 1984 Telugu-language Indian feature film
 Sitara (2019 film), an Indian Bengali-language film
 Sitara: Let Girls Dream, a 2020 Pakistani computer animated short film

Other uses
 Sitara (textile), an ornamental curtain used in the sacred sites of Islam
 Sitara ARM Processor, a family of processors available from Texas Instruments
 HAL HJT-36 Sitara, an Indian subsonic intermediate jet trainer aircraft

See also
 Sithara (disambiguation)
 Satara (disambiguation)